Didar (also Romanized as Dīdār) is a village in Hesar-e Valiyeasr Rural District, Central District, Avaj County, Qazvin Province, Iran. At the 2006 census, its population was 358, in 88 families.

References 

Populated places in Avaj County